Shaila de los Ángeles Morales de las Heras (born 28 August 1979), better known as Shaila Dúrcal, is a Spanish singer and songwriter. Her parents are singers Rocío Dúrcal and Antonio Morales ("Junior").

Biography
She was born in Madrid, daughter of Rocío Durcal, made her musical debut at the age of 12 on TVE singing for Nikka Costa. She studied singing under the tutelage of Robert Jeantal  before touring extensively with her mother Rocío as a back-up singer throughout Spain, Mexico and the United States. While continuing her studies in Miami, she was courted by several major record labels, recording a series of demos including a session of songs by English songwriter Richard Daniel Roman. 

In 2001 she moved to Mexico and signed to BMG who later released her eponymous debut album which was largely ignored by both critics and public alike. This album was followed by Recordando in 2006 on EMI, an album dedicated to her mother and which went straight to number one in Spain, going platinum in its second week after selling over 80,000 singles. She has sold more than 200,000 albums in Spain and 30,000 in Mexico as of 2014. She performed at the Latin Grammy Show, singing "Amor Eterno".

Discography

Albums
2004: Shaila (BMG) No. 99 MÉX
2006: Recordando (EMI) No. 1 ESP; No. 52 MÉX; No. 87 USA; No. 36 EUROPA
2008: Tanto Amor (EMI) No. 5 ESP; No. 80 MÉX
2009: Corazón Ranchero (EMI) No. 30 ESP; No. 27 MÉX
2011: Asi
2015: Shaila Dúrcal

Singles 
"No Sirvo Para Estar Sin Ti"
"Vuélvete La Luna"  No. 1 Spain
"Por Ti"
"Vivir Asi Es Morir De Amor"
"Sola"
"Tanto Cielo Perdido" No. 16 Chile
"Convenceme"
"No Me Interesa"

Charts and sales

"Recordando"

"Tanto Amor"

"Corazón Ranchero"

References

External links
 Dúrcal profile (translate Spanish to English), spanishprofessors.com. Retrieved August 19, 2014.
 Official Website
 Official Spain Website
 Acceso Total Performance, soundcheck.walmart.com. Retrieved August 19, 2014.

1979 births
Living people
Ranchera singers
Singers from Madrid
Capitol Latin artists
Spanish expatriates in Mexico
Spanish expatriates in the United States
Durcal, Shaila
21st-century Spanish singers
21st-century Spanish women singers
Women in Latin music